Triholder Marshall (born 25 May 1987) is a Guyana born American woman cricketer. She made her international debut at the 2011 Women's Cricket World Cup Qualifier.

References

External links 
 

1987 births
Living people
American women cricketers
Guyanese emigrants to the United States
Sportspeople from Georgetown, Guyana
21st-century American women